Abbos Abdurazzoqovich Atoyev (born 7 June 1986) is an Uzbek amateur boxer, best known for winning gold in the light heavyweight competition at the 2007 World Championships and at middleweight in 2009.  He also won a bronze medal at the 2012 Summer Olympics. He fights southpaw and was born in the village of Qulkhatib of Vabkent District of Bukhara Province.

Career
In June 2007 he won the 2007 Asian Amateur Boxing Championships, beating future Olympic champion Zhang Xiaoping in the final.

At the 2007 World Championships he defeated Frenchman Mamadou Diambang inside the distance, Croatian Marijo Šivolija in the quarterfinals, and Yerkebuian Shynaliyev of Kazakhstan in the semifinals. In the final, he sensationally upset Russian favorite Artur Beterbiyev after being knocked down in the third and trailing but edging it out back down the stretch.

At the 2008 Olympics, he was upset by Jahon Qurbonov in his first bout.

Middleweight
In 2009, he dropped down to middleweight and won the gold at the 2009 World Amateur Boxing Championships. At the 2010 Asian Games, he was shut out 0-7 in the final against Vijender Singh of India. At the 2011 World Amateur Boxing Championships, he was knocked out in the first round by Ryōta Murata of Japan.

At the 2012 Summer Olympics, he defeated Moroccan Badreddine Haddioui 11:9, Romanian Bogdan Juratoni 12:10 and Vijender Singh 17:13. He lost to Ryōta Murata 12:13 in the semi-final and had to settle for bronze.

References

External links

Living people
Boxers at the 2008 Summer Olympics
Boxers at the 2012 Summer Olympics
Olympic boxers of Uzbekistan
1986 births
Uzbeks
Asian Games medalists in boxing
Olympic bronze medalists for Uzbekistan
Olympic medalists in boxing
Boxers at the 2010 Asian Games
Medalists at the 2012 Summer Olympics
Uzbekistani male boxers
AIBA World Boxing Championships medalists
Asian Games silver medalists for Uzbekistan
Medalists at the 2010 Asian Games
Middleweight boxers